Kim Adams (born 17 December 1951) is a Canadian sculptor who is known for his assemblages combining prefabricated elements, often parts of cars or other machine-made structures. His visual style is influenced by industrial design, architecture and automotive design. His large-scale sculptures incorporate the model railroading technique of kitbashing, and bright stock colours. They may be shown in a park or street as well as in a museum setting. His small surreal landscapes are toy-sized, and may be installed on shelves.

Career
Adams was born in Edmonton and studied painting at the Northwest Institute of the Arts (1974), the Kootenay School of Art (1974-1975), and the University of Victoria (1975-1977), where he received an MFA in 1979. At the University of Victoria, he was taught by teachers with competing aesthetics, Mowry Baden and Roland Brener. By 1976, Adams was an abstract painter, but knew that sculpture and installation were his future. Despite his formal education, Adams found much of his inspiration outside the classroom.  

Adams’s sculpture work is composed of different parts: architectural structures, street events and miniature models of landscapes and architecture. His practice grew from creating miniature models in the 1980s to life-size sculptures and installations. In Toaster Work Wagon (1997), Adams assembled bicycles, lawn chairs, and parts of a 1960 Volkswagen bus. For his Autolamp (2008), he used the shell of a 1985 Dodge Ram which through holes which perforate it, gives light, transforming it into a glowing structure. The Mendel Art Gallery acquired Kim Adams' sculpture Love Birds (1998-2010) in 2013 composed of 11 foot tall sculptures - made from water barrels, grain-silo caps, and parts of two Ford Econoline vans. 

Since the 1980s, Adams has participated in solo and group exhibitions in Canada, Australia, the United States and Europe. In 1997, Adams participated in the international exhibition Skulptur Projekte 97, Münster, Germany. His major work for that project was Auto Office House,  permanently installed on the flat roof of a former 1950s gas station, now the Café Gasolin. More recently, his work was shown at the 2012 Kim Adams: One for the Road, Museum London, London, ON, and at Art Gallery of Ontario in an exhibition titled Kim Adams: Recent Works in 2013.

His work is included in many major public collections such as the Albright-Knox Art Gallery, Art Gallery of Ontario, the National Gallery of Canada, and the Centraal Museum in Utrecht, Holland. His Brueghel-Bosch Bus (1997-ongoing, sculpture-installation) is permanently installed at the Art Gallery of Hamilton. In 2001, he created a permanent outdoor work for the Vancouver Art Gallery.  

In 2012, Adams received the Gershon Iskowitz Prize. In 2013, he received a Guggenheim Fellowship, from the John Simon Guggenheim Memorial Foundation. In 2014, Adams won the Governor General's Award in Visual and Media Arts.

References

External links 
Kim Adams at the Wynick/Tuck Gallery
Kim Adams at the Canadian Contemporary Art Database

1951 births
Canadian sculptors
Living people
Governor General's Award in Visual and Media Arts winners
Canadian installation artists
20th-century Canadian artists
21st-century Canadian artists